Lars Svantesson (born 16 February 1933) is a Swedish former freestyle swimmer. He competed in two events at the 1952 Summer Olympics in Helsinki, Finland.

References

External links
 

1933 births
Living people
Olympic swimmers of Sweden
Swimmers at the 1952 Summer Olympics
People from Borås
Swedish male freestyle swimmers
Sportspeople from Västra Götaland County